Air Marshal Sir Geoffrey Howard Dhenin,  (2 April 1918 – 6 May 2011) was a British physician and senior Royal Air Force officer. From 1974 to 1978, he served as Director General of the RAF Medical Services.

Early life and education
Dhenin was born on 4 April 1918, three days after the formation of the Royal Air Force, in Bridgend, Glamorgan, Wales. He was educated at Hereford Cathedral School, then an all-boys grammar school in Hereford, Herefordshire. Having won a scholarship, he studied Natural Sciences at St John's College, Cambridge. He then continued his studies at Guy's Hospital Medical School, and qualified as a medical doctor.

In the 1950s, Dhenin undertook research for a Doctor of Medicine (MD) degree at the University of Cambridge. His doctoral thesis was titled "Radiation hazards in aviation", and was completed in 1956.

Military career

On 11 February 1943, Dhenin was commissioned into the Medical Branch of the Royal Air Force Volunteer Reserve as a flying officer (emergency). He was then appointed the medical officer of No. 166 Squadron RAF, an Avro Lancaster bomber squadron that was based at RAF Kirmington. During his time at Kirmington, he was awarded the George Medal for a rescuing an airman from a burning wreck in October 1943. On 8 June 1944, two days after D-Day, he transferred to a mobile field hospital. Based in Normandy, France, he was tasked with evacuating casualties by air from the campaign across North-West Europe.

On 1 September 1945, after the end of the Second World War, Dhenin transferred to the Medical Branch of the Royal Air Force as a flight lieutenant.

As part of the half-yearly promotions, he was promoted to air commodore (one star rank) on 1 January 1967.

Honours
On 14 January 1944, Dhenin was awarded the George Medal (GM), the second highest civil decoration of the UK, for rescuing an airman from a crashed and burning bomber. In the 1954 New Year Honours, he was awarded an Air Force Cross (AFC) for flying a plane into the mushroom cloud of the first British nuclear bomb test in Australia in 1953. In the 1959 Queen's Birthday Honours, he was awarded a bar to his Air Force Cross (i.e. he was awarded the AFC for a second time). In November 1974, he was appointed a Commander of the Order of St John (CStJ). In the 1975 New Year Honours, he was knighted as a Knight Commander of the Order of the British Empire (KBE).

References

1918 births
2011 deaths
20th-century British medical doctors
Alumni of St John's College, Cambridge
Commanders of the Order of St John
Knights Commander of the Order of the British Empire
People educated at Hereford Cathedral School
People from Bridgend
Recipients of the Air Force Cross (United Kingdom)
Recipients of the George Medal
Royal Air Force air marshals
Royal Air Force Medical Service officers
Royal Air Force Volunteer Reserve personnel of World War II
Welsh military personnel